The Viscount Jean-Jacques Desandrouin (May 25, 1681 – 16 November 1761) came from the district of Lodelinsart belonging to the Belgian city of Charleroi. His name is connected with the beginnings of the industrial revolution in Belgium and the massive expansion of coal mining in the area of Anzin in northern France. For the spelling of his name, there are the variants 'Désandrouin or 'Desandrouins or sometimes De Sandrouin and Androuins.

His activities changed the face of this region. His economic success was based on his involvement in the manufacture of glass, in metal production in forging and in promotion and transport of coal. He co-founded and owned the most important mining company in his time the Compagnie des mines d'Anzin, which was founded on November 19, 1757.

1681 births
1761 deaths
Belgian businesspeople
Viscounts of Belgium